Tomás Pais Neto Sarmento Castro (born 13 March 1999) is a Portuguese footballer who plays as a midfielder for Belenenses SAD.

Club career
Castro debuted for Belenenses SAD in a 2-0 Primeira Liga loss to Gil Vicente F.C. on 12 January 2020.

References

External links

ZeroZero Profile

1999 births
Living people
Footballers from Lisbon
Portuguese footballers
Association football midfielders
Belenenses SAD players
Primeira Liga players